Enemy Infestation is a strategy video game developed by Micro Forté and published by Ripcord Games for Microsoft Windows in 1998.

Reception

The game received average reviews according to the review aggregation website GameRankings.

References

External links
 

 Video games set on fictional planets
1998 video games
Alien invasions in video games
Multiplayer and single-player video games
Real-time strategy video games
Ripcord Games games
Video games developed in Australia
Video games set in outer space
Video games set in the 24th century
Windows games
Windows-only games